Righting Wrongs is a 1986 Hong Kong action film produced and directed by Corey Yuen, and also produced by and starring Yuen Biao, both of whom also serve as the film's action directors. The film also co-stars Cynthia Rothrock, Melvin Wong, Wu Ma, Roy Chiao and director Yuen himself. Righting Wrongs is the one of Yuen Biao's better known films that he made without film industry compatriots Sammo Hung and Jackie Chan.

Alternate titles
The film's Hong Kong English language title is Righting Wrongs. The international version (dubbed in English) is titled Above the Law. In the Philippines, the film was released as Fight to Win II.

Plot
Jason Ha Ling-ching is a dedicated, by the books prosecutor who has tried to maintain patience and tolerance under the somewhat flimsy laws of the court. However, when his mentor is publicly gunned down in New Zealand and the key witness of Ha's latest case and his entire family is wiped out overnight, Ha can no longer go by the book.

Ha's initial plan is to take the law into his own hands and kill the two men he believes called for his witness' murder. He is successful in killing the first, which causes the Hong Kong Police Department to wake up and take action to regain order. Enter Senior Inspector Cindy Si, who is put on the case to find the killer under her superior, Superintendent Wong Ching-wai. However, when Ha goes to kill the second defendant, Chow Ting-kwong, he is already dead. Unbeknownst to them, both of the defendants were working under an even higher power, known only as "Crown". However, it is soon discovered that "Crown" is none other than Superintendent Wong, who was also Chow's killer.

Once Si realizes that Wong is the true mastermind behind all of the recent murders taking place, she and Ha finally work together to bring him in to prove he is not "above the law". Si storms through an airport hangar to confront Wong, but is fatally impaled by Wong using a hand drill. Ha arrives at the scene to fight Wong in the hangar and aboard a plane. Ha kills Wong with an axe to the back of the neck and jumps off the plane before it crashes, but dies on impact after landing into the ocean and his lifeless body afloats.

Alternate ending
In an alternate ending, both Si and Ha survive. Ha, however, is arrested and sentenced to eight years in prison for manslaughter (the Mandarin dub has him given a life sentence for first-degree murder).

The 2022 UK Blu-ray release features two additional endings - both of which alternate on the fates of either Si or Ha. The viewer can choose between the four different endings of the "Ultimate Cut" or let the "Ending Randomiser" select the ending.

An unused edit of the Hong Kong ending sees a yacht pass by Ha's lifeless body on the ocean. The women aboard want to save him, but the yacht's owner turns the ship away instead.

Cast
 Yuen Biao as Jason Ha Ling-Ching
 Cynthia Rothrock as Senior Inspector Cindy Si
 Roy Chiao as Magistrate Judge
 Melvin Wong as Superintendent Wong Ching-Wai
 Louis Fan as Sammy Yu Chi-Man
 Corey Yuen as 'Bad Egg'
 Sandy Chan as Jason Ha's Girlfriend
 Chung Fat as Red Porsche Policeman
 Wu Ma as Uncle Tsai
 Peter Cunningham as Black Assassin
 Lau Sing-ming as Sammy's Grandfather
 Karen Sheperd as Karen
 Tai Po as Yellow Shirt Cop
 James Tien - Chow Ting-Kwong
 Hsu Hsia as Mr. Leung (protected witness)
 Lau Chau-sang as Cop
 Chow Kam-kong as Station Cop
 Stephen Chan as Hung
 Siu Bo as Cop Guarding Mr. Leung / Hanger Thug (2 roles)
 Yuen Miu as Cop Guarding Mr. Leung
 King Lee as Cop
 Paul Chang as Bill 'Four Eyes Bill'
 Hsiao Hou 
 Fruit Chan

Theme song
Proud (狂傲)
Composer: Akira Mitake
Lyricist: Lo Keok-chim
Singer: Jacky Cheung

Production
According to Rothrock, Golden Harvest originally signed her to play the villain opposite of Jackie Chan in Armour of God, but when production halted due to Chan's near-fatal filming accident, the studio reassigned Rothrock to Righting Wrongs with Biao. While practicing her moves for the film, she injured her right ACL; rather than take time off to undergo surgery, she proceeded to shoot her scenes using her left leg for her kicks. Filming lasted five-and-a-half months.

During filming, Biao sustained a back injury while filming the scene where his character jumped off the second story of a house, despite landing feet-first on some padding dressed up as grass.

When the studio needed another female martial artist for the film, Rothrock recommended Karen Sheperd. Upon arriving in Hong Kong, Sheperd demanded that her character should not die, as it would ruin her reputation. In addition, she refused to kill a boy, as written on the screenplay. After Rothrock and Sheperd's fight scene was completed, the crew filmed a body double doing the scenes Sheperd refused to do, including her character's death.

The film's original ending was met with a negative reception during its midnight screening in Hong Kong; because of this, Rothrock stopped filming China O'Brien and flew from Los Angeles to Hong Kong to reshoot the ending for the Mandarin and international versions.

Home media
Righting Wrongs was released on DVD in the U.S. by Dragon Dynasty on 29 May 2007 under the title Above the Law.

The film was released on Blu-ray in the U.S. by Vinegar Syndrome on 30 August 2022. The three-disc set includes the original 96 minute Hong Kong cut, the 100 minute international Mandarin cut, and the 92 minute English Above the Law cut, plus the 1990 documentary The Best of the Martial Arts Films.

Righting Wrongs was released on Blu-ray in the UK by 88 Films on 24 October 2022. The two-disc set includes all three edits and a 106 minute "Ultimate Cut" that combines both Hong Kong and international endings and adds two re-edited endings that can be randomly selected by the player.

Accolades

References

External links

1986 films
1986 action films
1986 martial arts films
1980s Cantonese-language films
1980s Hong Kong films
Films directed by Corey Yuen
Films set in Hong Kong
Films set in New Zealand
Films shot in Hong Kong
Films shot in New Zealand
Girls with guns films
Golden Harvest films
Hong Kong action films
Hong Kong films about revenge
Hong Kong martial arts films
Hong Kong police films
Hong Kong vigilante films
Police detective films
Works about prosecutors